White Brigade can mean any of the following:

 Witte Brigade, a World War II Belgian resistance group
 Brigada Blanca, a Mexican paramilitary group consisting of army and police personnel that used illegal tactics to destroy guerrilla movements.

See also:

 White Army